The Biscay autonomous football team was the regional football team for the province of Biscay, Spain, active between the 1910s and the 1930s. They were never affiliated with FIFA or UEFA, because Biscay is represented internationally by the Spain national football team.

History

In the first half of the 20th century, the provincial federation selected a representative team for friendly matches, and also took part in two editions of the inter-regional Prince of Asturias Cup, the first of which in 1922-23 ending in a quarter-final exit at the hands of Asturias after a dramatic 4–3 loss in the replay (the original game ended 1-1), but they managed to exact revenge in the following tournament when they faced Asturias in the quarter-finals again, this time winning 4–2 with goals from Carmelo, Laca and Travieso, but in the semi-finals, they were knocked-out by eventual champions Catalonia 0–1. Prior to the split between Gipuzkoa and Biscay, their players also formed a combined 'North' team (nominally including Cantabria, but dominated by Basque players) which evolved into the Basque Country team.

In 2013, the Biscay Federation (which continues to operate provincial football leagues at the sixth level of the pyramid and below) celebrated its centenary, taking the foundation date as that of the North Federation. A commemorative match was staged between the amateur teams of Biscay and Gipuzkoa (1–1 draw, won by Biscay on penalties), as had also taken place in 1964 for the 50th anniversary (6–0 to Biscay).

The Biscay professional selection had reformed for the Castilian Federation's 'golden jubilee' in 1963, playing Andalusia, and in June 2013 they did so again to face Athletic Bilbao, celebrating the 100th anniversary of both the federation's foundation and the opening of San Mamés stadium, as well as being its last match before demolition. It was an event of familiarity for the participants, with many of the Biscay players having close ties to Athletic, and many of the club's current players originating from the province. Despite being unable to include the opposition's employees in their squad, Biscay won the fixture 1–0 (Athletic introduced several retired players for cameo appearances in the later stages).

Results

Table

Notable players
 Carmelo Goyenechea 
 Travieso

See also
:Category:Sportspeople from Biscay

References 

 

Football in the Basque Country (autonomous community)
Spanish autonomous football teams
Representative teams of association football leagues
Sport in Biscay